The Dialogue between a Man and His God is the earliest known text to address the answer to the question of why a god permits evil, or theodicy, a reflection on human suffering. It is a piece of Wisdom Literature extant on a single clay cuneiform tablet written in Akkadian and attributed to Kalbanum, on the last line, an individual otherwise unknown. It is dated to the latter part of the Old Babylonian period, around about the reign of Ammi-Ditana (reigned 1683–1640s BC) according to Lambert, and is currently housed in the Louvre Museum, accession number AO 4462. It is of unknown provenance as it was purchased from an antiquities dealer by the Museum in 1906. It shares much of its style with an earlier Sumerian work, “Man and His God”, a penitential prayer of the UR III period.

The text

With sixty-nine lines arranged in ten strophes, each separated by a horizontal line, the work is structured around a dialogue between two people, one of whom has lost favor with both his lord and his personal god, resulting in his intense suffering from an undisclosed illness. The text is difficult and fragmentary, especially in the middle leading to debate among scholars about its meaning and purpose. The opening line has been rendered as “a man weeps for a friend to his god” or, alternatively, “a young man was imploring his god as a friend”.

He protests his innocence, “the wrong I did I do not know!”, and holds his god responsible for his condition. He continues his lament and cries for deliverance in a sufferer's prayer. At the end, the text switches to a third-person narrator who relates the man's pleas did not go unheeded and that his god responded to his entreaties with his deliverance from his afflictions, with the proviso “you must never till the end of time forget [your] god”, a “happy ending” framing device which also appears in other works of this genre.

Translation

Primary publications

  pl. vii and viii (text)
  (with collations)
 
 
  edition, with collations
  (translation)

External links

Dialogue between a Man and His God at CDLI

References

17th-century BC literature
1906 archaeological discoveries
Akkadian literature
Ancient Near East wisdom literature
Clay tablets
First Babylonian Empire
Near East and Middle East antiquities of the Louvre
Theodicy